The following is a summary of the  Rune Grammofon albums. Rune Grammofon is a Norwegian record label.

References

External links 
 

Discographies of Norwegian record labels